Hilalpur is a village near Hajipur in Vaishali district, Bihar, Zipcode- 844502.

This village is very big in area, occupying 2200 bigha of area. People of almost all castes can be found in the village. People have divided this village in different tolas for their identity. Land of this village is very fertile, people grow wheat, rice and seasonal fruits, and bananas in huge quantity.

The village is known for its green mango, banana, and lichi trees. Canara Bank of India has a branch in the village

The road which connects Hilalpur to Hajipur is very bad. Road conditions in this area is not good due to bad political leaders.

References

External links
Hilalpur Hajipur vaishali bihar

Villages in Vaishali district